The 1990 United States Senate election in Georgia was held on November 6, 1990. Incumbent Democratic U.S. Senator Sam Nunn won re-election to a fourth term uncontested. As of 2021, this is the second to last time that a candidate from either party won a race in Georgia with 100% of the vote. The other time being in the 1992 Atlanta City Council election where Bob Glettman won with 100.0% of the vote, running unopposed.

Candidates

Democratic 
 Sam Nunn, incumbent U.S. Senator

Results

See also 
 1990 United States Senate elections

References 

Georgia
1990
1990 Georgia (U.S. state) elections